The Diocese of Eastern Zambia is one of five Anglican dioceses in Zambia within the Church of the Province of Central Africa: the current bishop is William Mchombo.

References

Anglicanism in Zambia
East Zambia
Anglican bishops of Eastern Zambia